Thieves in Thailand ( "Haramiyyah fi Tayland") is a 2003 Egyptian film directed by Sandra Nashaat. It is a 35 mm film and lasts for 105 minutes. Lisa Anderson of the Chicago Tribune uses the film as an example of increasing conservatism in Egypt.

Plot
It is set in Thailand and includes a romance. The main character, Fatin, is a late 20s, lower middle class man from Cairo who travels to Thailand. No intimate contact, including a kiss, is seen.

Production
The naming was meant to coincide with Ismail Yassin films. The films, which used the same cast members and the same style but had differing themes and stories, started with Ismail Yassin fi ("Ismail Yassin in"). Likewise this film was produced after Nashaat's Harameya fi KG2 (Thieves in KG2).

Cast

 Maged El-Kidwani – Fatin
 Karim Abdel-Aziz – Ibrahim, Fatin's brother
 Hanan Tork – Hanan – Hanan is Ibrahim's wife and is forced to be his accomplice

Reception
The film was very popular in Egypt. Sandra Nashaat said "The film was as well received as I expected, although I feel it could have been seen by a greater number of people. But of course due to the war fewer people are going to the movies. One of my concerns was that Harameya fi Thailand would be compared and contrasted with Harameya fi KG2, because they are two entirely different films. In the end the inevitable happened, but at least it was positive: many liked Harameya fi Thailand more."

Sherif Iskander Nakhla of Al-Ahram Weekly said "As a whole the film has memorable moments, yet its narrative structure falls short of the highest standards." Lisa Anderson of the Chicago Tribune described the film as "A mindless romp spiced with lush Thai landscapes".

See also

 Cinema of Egypt
 Thieves in KG2

References
 Armes, Roy. Dictionary of African Filmmakers. Indiana University Press, July 11, 2008. , 9780253000422.
 Hillauer, Rebecca. Encyclopedia of Arab Women Filmmakers. American University in Cairo Press, 2005. , 9789774249433.

Notes

External links
 

2000s romance films
2003 films
Films set in Thailand
Egyptian romance films